Barobaria Union is a Union parishad of Chitalmari Upazila, Bagerhat District in Khulna Division of Bangladesh. It has an area of 38.95 km2 (15.04 sq mi) and a population of 25,120.

References

Unions of Chitalmari Upazila
Unions of Bagerhat District
Unions of Khulna Division